Stefano Zappalà (6 February 1941 in Aci Bonaccorsi – 15 April 2018 in Latina) was an Italian politician and Member of the European Parliament for Central with the Forza Italia, part of the European People's Party and is vice-chair of the European Parliament's Committee on Civil Liberties, Justice and Home Affairs.

He was a substitute for the Committee on the Internal Market and Consumer Protection, a member of the Delegation for relations with the Palestinian Legislative Council and a substitute for the Delegation to the EU-Kazakhstan, EU-Kyrgyzstan and EU-Uzbekistan Parliamentary Cooperation Committees, and for relations with Tajikistan, Turkmenistan and Mongolia.

Education
 1959: Secondary school-leaving certificate in classical subjects

Career
 1960–1962: Military Academy of Modena
 1962–1964: Artillery College (Turin)
 1971–1973: higher technical course (Rome)
 1964: graduate in strategic sciences
 1973: degree in mathematics
 1976: degree in civil engineering
 until 1979: Officer in the Italian army
 1980–1994: self-employed engineer and businessman
 since 1994: Deputy coordinator for Forza Italia, Lazio
 1997–2002: Member of Latina City Council
 1995–2000: Member of Lazio Regional Council
 2002–2005: Mayor of Pomezia, Rome
 since 1999: Member of the European Parliament

See also
 2004 European Parliament election in Italy

References

External links
 
 
 

1941 births
2018 deaths
Forza Italia MEPs
MEPs for Italy 2004–2009
MEPs for Italy 1999–2004
People from the Province of Catania